Psychedelic rock in Australia and New Zealand is the psychedelic rock music scene in Australia and New Zealand.

Overview

Although only a few singles gained recognition outside the region, the thriving Australian and New Zealand rock scenes formed in the wake of Beatlemania produced a large quantity of original psychedelic pop and rock music. Much of this was strongly influenced by British psychedelia, since many bands included first-generation British and European immigrants, such as The Twilights, whose members were British immigrants. 

These immigrants were able to keep up to date on current musical developments, thanks to regular "care packages" of the latest singles and albums, tapes and cassettes of radio broadcasts, and even the latest Mod fashions, sent to them by family and friends back in the UK. After gaining local success, a number of these groups returned to the UK to further their musical careers. 

The most internationally successful Australian pop-rock band of this period were The Easybeats, formed in Sydney in 1964 by a group of English, Scottish and Dutch immigrants, who scored a string of local hits in Australia and became hugely popular there before travelling to the UK. They recorded their international hit "Friday on My Mind" (1966) in London and remained there until they disbanded in 1970. A similar path was pursued by the Bee Gees, formed in Brisbane, but whose first album Bee Gees' 1st (1967), was recorded in London, and gave them three major hit singles and contained folk, rock and psychedelic elements, heavily influenced by the Beatles.

The Masters Apprentices started out as an R&B band in the style of the early Rolling Stones and the Pretty Things, but they absorbed changes in music spearheaded by The Beatles. In 1967 they released several acclaimed psychedelic singles. "Wars or Hands of Time" (the B-side of their 1966 debut single "Undecided" is generally regarded as the first Australian pop single to address the Vietnam War. Their second single "Buried and Dead" (1967), was influenced by the nascent "Raga rock" genre. Their third single, the psych-pop classic "Living In A Child's Dream", became a major national hit and was voted "Single of the Year" by the readers of the Australian pop magazine Go-Set. The group also performed at one of the first psychedelic "happenings" in Australia, the "Living In A Child's Dream Ball", staged on 14 October 1967 at the University of New South Wales in Sydney. The show featured a full psychedelic light-show with liquid slide projections, smoke machines and mirror balls, and the band was wheeled onto the stage inside a specially-constructed giant die. All the groups' early singles tracks were penned by rhythm guitarist Mick Bower, who quit the music scene for health reasons soon after "Living In A Child's Dream" was released. After a period of upheaval, the band was able to continue with new members, scoring another Australian psych-pop hit in late 1967 with the classic Brian Cadd song "Elevator Driver". 

The Twilights, also formed in Adelaide and likewise became nationwide pop stars in the mid-1960s before making the trip to London. In London they recorded a series of minor hits and participated in the psychedelic scene, before returning home in mid-1967, where they performed the entire Sgt Pepper's album live on stage some weeks before its official release in Australia. This was followed by the release of their psychedelic 1968 concept album Once upon a Twilight.

Although The Easybeats were the only Australian band working in the psychedelic style to score a major international hit, many other Australian bands scored local or national hits with singles that were strongly influenced by psychedelic trends. This included the cult Brisbane-based group The Wild Cherries, led by guitarist Lobby Loyde, whose 1967 single "Krome Plated Yabby"/That's Life" combined influences from R&B, soul and psychedelia, and the single's driving B-side, "That's Life" is believed to be the first Australian pop single to employ phasing in its production. The most successful New Zealand band of the period, The La De Das, produced the psychedelic pop concept album The Happy Prince (1968), based on the Oscar Wilde children's classic, but failed to break through in Britain and the wider world.

Although British influences were predominant in Australian and New Zealand bands, a number of progressive Sydney-based groups such as Tamam Shud and Tully produced music that combined influences from Eastern mystical philosophy, avant-garde jazz and American psychedelic groups such as The Grateful Dead and Jefferson Airplane. Both bands also regularly collaborated with the experimental Sydney film and light-show collective Ubu, and Tully were also notable for being the first Australian group to buy and use a Moog synthesiser, as well as performing as the house band in the original Australian stage production of Hair, which premiered in Sydney in 1969. Australian psychedelic music in the late 1960s peaked in popularity with the two singles by Melbourne singer Russell Morris. His 1969 solo debut "The Real Thing", penned by mid-Sixties pop star Johnny Young, broke new ground in Australian popular music, for its lavish production by Ian Meldrum and John L Sayers. and for its running time of almost seven minutes, unprecedented for an Australian pop single.  It was reputedly the most expensive Australian single ever produced up to that time. It became a number one hit in Australia, where it charted for 23 weeks, and also went to number one on local charts in New York, Houston and Chicago. It was followed by "Part Three Into Paper Walls", co-written by Young and Morris, which was deliberately crafted as a virtual sequel to "The Real Thing". It also featured  dazzling production, was just over seven minutes long, and gave Morris his second consecutive number one hit in Australia. 

Other Australian classic rock bands later had moderate success within the realm. The Little River Band, whose 1979 hit "Cool Change" combined psychedelia with elements of pop, jazz, soft rock, and progressive rock. Midnight Oil began their career in the forays of new wave and post-punk, utilizing a style akin to Sgt. Pepper's Lonely Hearts Club Band and Diamond Dogs to create a droning final note on their 1981 record 10, 9, 8, 7, 6, 5, 4, 3, 2, 1. Hoodoo Gurus incorporated science-fiction into their college rock concept albums and, to an extent, the droning distorted guitars utilized by AC/DC to incorporate and develop upon psychedelic themes. Through to the 1990s, Australian acts such as The Vines presented a new era of music, a fusion between the psychedelic pop of the 1960s and the more modern rock stylings of 1990s-era bands such as Nirvana and Pearl Jam.

The neo-psychedelic rock scene has been heavily pioneered by Australian psychedelic and garage rock acts. One-man act Tame Impala, whose real name is Kevin Parker, led the charge with their 2012 breakthrough hit "Elephant", which reached no. 8 on Billboard's Alternative and received widespread radio play. This led to large demand of the act as a music festival headliner. Hiatus Kaiyote, led by singer Nai Palm, emerged around the same time, as did Perth native psych-rock Pond, with each offering a psychedelic sound influenced by R&B and hip-hop, creating music laced with reverb and complicated by bizarre rhythmic syncopation. 

King Gizzard & the Lizard Wizard has also been notable on the Melbourne psychedelic scene, releasing 18 studio albums and creating Flightless Records. Their sound draws from diverse genres such as garage rock, hard rock and heavy metal, thrash metal (on Infest the Rats' Nest), Indian classical music, acoustic music, microtonal music (Flying Microtonal Banana, K.G. (album), L.W. (album)), boogie rock (demonstrated on Fishing for Fishies), dream pop (Butterfly 3000), indie rock, raga rock, blues rock, surf rock, jazz fusion, progressive rock, art rock and punk rock. The success of King Gizzard, and the appeal of their high-energy live concerts, helped launch the careers of other Flightless recording acts including The Murlocs, Stonefield, and Tropical Fuck Storm. Other important and emerging acts in the scene include Courtney Barnett, who developed a record label and a significant following, Psychedelic Porn Crumpets, Rolling Blackouts Coastal Fever, Bananagun, GUM, and Wolfmother.

See also 

 Rock music in Australia
 Aboriginal rock
 Australian indie rock

References

Australia and New Zealand
1960s in Australian music
1960s in New Zealand music
New Zealand styles of music